Xylota danieli is a species of hoverfly in the family Syrphidae.

Distribution
Russia, Japan.

References

Eristalinae
Insects described in 2014
Diptera of Asia